Latin obscenity is the profane, indecent, or impolite vocabulary of Latin, and its uses. Documented obscenities occurred rarely in classical Latin literature, limited to certain types of writing such as epigrams, but they are commonly used in the graffiti written on the walls of Pompeii and Herculaneum.

Among the documents of interest in this area is a letter written by Cicero in 45 BC (ad Fam. 9.22) to a friend called Paetus, in which he alludes to a number of obscene words without actually naming them.

Apart from graffiti, the writers who used obscene words most were Catullus and Martial in their shorter poems. Another source is the anonymous Priapeia (see External links below), a collection of 95 epigrams supposedly written to adorn statues of the fertility god Priapus, whose wooden image was customarily set up to protect orchards against thieves. The earlier poems of Horace also contained some obscenities. However, the satirists Persius and Juvenal, although often describing obscene acts, did so without mentioning the obscene words.

Medical, especially veterinary, texts also use certain anatomical words that, outside of their technical context, might have been considered obscene.

Latin taboo words

Cicero's letter ad Fam. 9.22
In a letter to one of his friends, written about 45 BC, Cicero discusses a number of obscenities in Latin. It appears that the friend, Lucius Papirius Paetus, (whose letters to Cicero have not been preserved) had used the word  ("penis") in one of his letters. Cicero praises him for his forthrightness, which he says conforms to the teachings of the Stoic philosophers, but says that he himself prefers modesty. 

In the letter Cicero alludes to a number of obscene words, without actually mentioning them. He does not object to using the word , and says that , which in his day was obscene, was formerly just a euphemism meaning "tail".

Degrees of obscenity
There thus appear to have been various degrees of obscenity in Latin, with words for anything to do with sex in the most obscene category. These words are strictly avoided in most types of Latin literature; however, they are common in graffiti, and also in certain genres of poetry, such as the short poems known as epigrams, such as those written by Catullus and Martial. The poet Horace also used obscenities in his early poems, that is the Epodes and the first book of Satires, but later writers of satire such as Juvenal and Persius avoided the coarser words even when discussing obscene topics. There were, however, some occasions in public life, such as in triumphal processions, at weddings, and at certain festivals, where obscenities were traditionally allowed. The purpose of these was presumably twofold, first to ward off the evil eye or potential envy of the gods, and second to promote fertility.

Euphemistic expressions
A very common way of avoiding words for sexual acts was simply to omit the word in question. J.N. Adams collects numerous examples of this. For example, in Horace (Epodes 12.15):

("You are capable of [having sex with] Inachia three times in a night.")

("And when the Ithacan was snoring, modest though she was,   Penelope always kept her hand there.")

: the penis 
 is the basic Latin word for penis. It is used 48 times in Martial, 26 times in the Priapeia, and 18 times in Pompeian inscriptions.

 
 ("May I die if it doesn't shame meto use obscene and improper words;but when you, Priapus, as a god, shamelesslyshow me your balls hanging out,it is appropriate for me to speak of cunts and cocks.")

Martial mocks a friend who despised effeminate clothing, explaining why he suspects that he is secretly homosexual:

 ("He will ask why I suspect him to be a 'soft' man.We go to the baths together. He never looks at anything above,but examines the athletes with devouring eyes,and looks at their dicks with constantly moving lips.")

A  (the word occurs only in Martial), according to Housman, was a man "who performs feats of strength in public". Rabun Taylor disagrees and sees a  more as a kind of rent boy who hung around in the baths in search of patrons.

 also frequently appears in the poetry of Catullus. He uses  as a nickname for Mamurra, as if it were an ordinary name, as in his epigram 105:

 
 ("That prick tries to climb the Pimpleian mount (of poetry);the Muses drive him out with pitchforks.")

(Pimpleia was a place in Pieria in northern Greece associated with the Muses (the nine goddesses of poetry and music).)

Etymology 
, the "mind" (i.e.; "the little mind"). Other hypotheses have also been suggested, though none generally accepted.

Synonyms and metaphors

is also a basic Latin obscenity for "penis", in particular for a penis with the foreskin retracted due to erection and glans exposed, as in the illustration of the god Mercury below. As a result, it was "not a neutral technical term, but an emotive and highly offensive word", most commonly used in despective or threatening contexts of violent acts against a fellow male or rival rather than mere sex ( "fucking"). It is found frequently in graffiti of the type  (= )  ("Whoever reads this, you're a dickhead").

It is found less frequently in Classical Latin literature, but it does appear in Catullus 28:

 

 ("O Memmius, while I lay on my back for a long timeyou fed me good and slow with that entire beam of yours.But as far as I can see, you guys have met with the same fate:for you have been stuffed with a "verpa" no less large!")

Catullus is here speaking metaphorically. He complains that when he accompanied Gaius Memmius, the governor of Bithynia (57-56 BC), as part of his entourage, he was not allowed to make money out of the position. From this poem it is clear that Catullus's friends Veranius and Fabullus were kept under an equally close rein when they accompanied Lucius Piso to his province of Macedonia in 57-55 BC.

By extension,  as a masculine adjective or noun, referred to a man whose  was exposed by erection or by circumcision; thus Juvenal (14.100) has

 
 ("To guide only the circumcised [i.e. Jews] to the fountain that they seek").

And in poem 47 Catullus writes:

 
 ("Did that unsheathed Priapus prefer you guysto my little Veranius and Fabullus?")

Martial (7.81) mocks one such actor as follows:

("Such a big brooch clothes Menophilus's penisthat it is enough for all the comic actors in the world.I believed (since we often go to the baths together)that he was anxious to preserve his voice, Flaccus.But one day, while he was wrestling in the middle of the palaestra with everyone watching,the poor man's brooch fell off. He was circumcised!")

or 
This is very rare and found only in one line of Horace and a fragment of the satirist Lucilius. The passage in Horace (Sat. 1.2.68) is as follows, in which he advises a young man who was beaten up as a result of an affair with the dictator Sulla's daughter:

("What if, in the words of his penis, his mind were to say to the man when he sees such troubles: 'What exactly do you want? Do I ever demand a cunt descended from a famous consul or veiled in a fancy gown when my passion grows hot?'")

And Lucilius says, referring to the fact that Roman men apparently used to masturbate with their left hand:

("But with his left hand as his girlfriend, he wipes away his muttō'''s tears.")

The word  may be related to the marriage deity Mutunus Tutunus.

Although  itself is rare, the derivative  ("well-endowed") is found twice in Martial, as at 3.73:

("You sleep with well-endowed boys, Phoebus,and the thing that stands up for them does not stand up for you.")

The Latin word  itself originally meant "tail". Cicero's , 9.22, observes that  originally was an innocuous word, but that the meaning of male sexual organ had become primary by his day. The euphemism is used occasionally by Catullus, Persius, Juvenal, and Martial, and even once by the historian Sallust, who writes that the supporters of the anti-government rebel Catiline included 

("whatever shameless man, adulterer, or glutton had ruined his ancestral property by hand, stomach, or 'tail'")

Commenting on this passage, St Augustine notes that Sallust's use of the term  in this phrase was not offensive. The word did not survive into Romance, however, and occurs only once in a Pompeian inscription.

Juvenal, showing his knack for describing grossly obscene matters without using taboo words, writes as follows in one of his satires (9.43-4):

("Or do you think it is an easy or straightforward thing to drive a proper-sized 'tail'inside someone's guts and there meet with yesterday's dinner?")

In one place in his Satires (Serm. 2.7.50) Horace writes:

("Whichever girl receives the blows of my swelling 'tail',or when I'm on my back sexily rides my 'horse' with her buttocks,sends me away neither with a bad reputation nor worried thata richer or more handsome guy might piss in the same place.")

The words  ("nerve" or "sinew") and In one of Horace's Epodes (12) a woman boasts of one of her lovers, Coan Amyntas, 

("on whose indomitable groin a sinew grows,    more constant than a new tree clings to the hills.")

 or 

And one of the characters in Petronius's Satyricon, Ascyltus, is described as follows:

("For he had a weight on his groins so big that you'd think the man himself was just an appendage of his phallus.")

 or 
This word was used by the satirist Lucilius and by the medical writer Celsus (6.18.2). 

In the same passage (6.18.2), Celsus refers to the foreskin as  "skin", and to the glans as  "acorn". Martial also uses the word  in an obscene pun (12.75.3):

("Secundus has buttocks fed with acorns")

The word  seems to have been children's slang for the penis; compare English pee-pee. It appears in Martial 11.71:

 
 ("Natta sucks the pee-pee of his athlete,compared to whom, Priapus is a eunuch.")

The penis was compared to a throat or neck in these lines of Martial (9.27.1–2), which mock a philosopher who has plucked the hairs from his private parts with tweezers:

 ("when you carry around depilated balls, Chrestus,and a dick just like a vulture's neck")

Similarly Persius in his 4th satire refers to the penis as  "neck, gullet". In the following lines he imagines young Alcibiades (or an Alcibiades-like youth) sunbathing in a public bath and comments on the fact that though he now has a full beard on his chin he still "weeds" all the hairs out of his private parts:

("But if after being oiled you take a rest and fix the sun on your skin,near you there is a stranger to nudge you will his elbow and spit scornfully:'What morals! To weed one's penis and the secret parts of one's loinsand to display a withered  to the public!And when you comb a balsamed rug on your jaw,why does a shorn  stick out from your groin?Even though five gym-attendants pluck at that vegetationand make your boiled buttocks smooth with their curved tweezers,yet that "bracken" of yours can't be tamed by any plough.' ")

That  here means "throat" or "gullet" is supported by a scholiast (early commentator). Another scholar Wehrle, pointing to the horticultural imagery, thinks the metaphor refers to the larva of a weevil.

The obscure word  (gen. ) seems to have meant a sexualized caricature with an abnormally large penis, such as the Romans were known to draw. It appears in Catullus 37: 

 
("I will graffiti the front of the tavern with s") 

and in a graffito from Pompeii: 

 
("may you guys eat shit, whoever you are who drew sopios!'") 

Erection
The verb  meant "to have an erection". Martial (6.36) in one epigram teases a certain friend:

("Your cock is as big as your nose is long, Papylus, so that you can smell it whenever you get an erection.")

Suetonius's Lives of the Twelve Caesars, quotes a letter from Mark Antony to Augustus which contains the sentence:

 
 ("Does it make any difference where or in which woman you get hard?")

The participle  means 'erect'. Martial describes the habit of a certain girl of weighing a lover's penis in her hand (10.55.1):

 
 
 ("Whenever Marulla weighs an erect penis in her fingers...")

Martial uses the word  ("a hard one") alone to refer to a penis in the following line, mocking a certain Greek philosopher who despite his beard was effeminate (9.47.6):

 
 ("You enjoy having a hard one in your soft backside")

Horace (Sat. 1.2.116-8) writes:

...
("When your groin swells up, then ifa slave girl or home-reared slave boy is available, on whom you can mount an attackstraightaway, do you prefer to burst with the erection?")

Similarly in Priapeia 33.5, the god Priapus says:

("Shameful indeed to do, but so that I don't burst with desire,I shall put down my sickle and my hand will become my girlfriend.")

Ovid (Amōrēs 3.7.65-6):

("But my members lay there as if prematurely dead,   shamefully, more languid than yesterday's rose.")

And a girlfriend of Horace's chides him with the words (Epodes 12):

("You are less languid with Inachia than with me!")

While Catullus (67.23) speaks of an impotent husband in these terms: 

("whose little dagger, hanging more flaccid than a tender beet (a vegetable)never raised itself to the middle of his tunic")

 In the Romance languages 
 has evolved into Sicilian and Italian  and South Sardinian .  also exists in Spanish.  is preserved in some Romance dialects, usually with another meaning;  is a sort of stirrup and spur in a Calabrian dialect, possibly named for its shape. Most Romance languages have adopted metaphorical euphemisms as the chief words for the penis; as in Spanish, Portuguese and Italian , obscene for penis, and in Romanian  (although  is far more common), in Catalan and French , from Latin , "staff", and French  ("tail"), from Latin  "tail". The Portuguese  "penis", first attested in the 10th century, is thought to derive from a Vulgar Latin word  "a little stake". The Italian  has no obvious Latin ancestor. A number of different suggestions have been made for its origin, but none has yet gained general acceptance.

 : the testicles 
It appears to have had an alternative form *, from which the Spanish  and other Romance forms are derived. (One late Latin source has the spelling ).

 Etymology 
Tucker, without explanation, gives *qogh-sleǐ-os (*kwogh-sley-os?), and relates it to cohum, an obscure word for "yoke".

However, this etymology is not generally accepted today, and according to the  the etymology is unknown. In texts, the word for testicles is always spelled with col- not cull-, and is plural.

 Usage 
Cicero in his letter discussing obscene Latin words (ad Fam. 9.22) says at one point  ("Lanuvian  are respectable, but "Cliternian" ones are indecent"). (Lanuvium and Cliternia were small towns not far from Rome.)

The word occurs in Petronius (44):

 
("if we had any balls (i.e. if we were real men), he wouldn't be so pleased with himself!") 

A Pompeian graffito quotes a line of iambic verse: 

("When an old man lies down, his testicles cover his butthole.")

The form of the line is reminiscent of the proverbial sayings of Publilius Syrus, many of which employ the same metre.

 Synonyms and metaphors 
This word may have derived from the Latin for "witnesses". Cicero's letter says  ("In a court of law, witnesses is a quite decent word; not too much so elsewhere.") Katz (1998) draws attention to the fact that in some cultures it was customary to take a solemn oath while laying hands on the testicles either of a living person (as in Genesis 24:2-4; 47:29-31), or of a sacrificed animal (as described in Demosthenes 23.67f); a similar ritual took place in Umbria when dedicating a sacrificial animal. According to Katz, the word  itself appears to be derived from the root trityo- ("third") and originally meant a third party.

The two meanings of  open the door for puns such as the following from Martial (2.72):

("What about the fact that Caecilius has witnesses/testicles, Postumus?")

Or Cicero's  ("outstanding witnesses!") in his amusing account of two witnesses hiding naked in a public bathhouse.

The diminutive  was entirely confined to the anatomical sense; it is used 33 times by the medical writer Celsus, but  not at all. The satirists Persius and Juvenal also used the word .

The exact words of the text here are disputed, but the general sense is clear:

("He tore off the weights of his groin with a sharp flint")

Ovid ( 2.241) recounting the same story, and perhaps implying that Attis removed the whole organ, similarly uses the phrase  ("the burden of his groin").

Other euphemisms are used in other writers. Ovid (Amōrēs 2.3) uses the phrase :

("He who first cut off the genital parts of boys   ought himself to have suffered the wounds which he made.")

 In the Romance languages 
 is productive in most of the Romance languages: cf. Italian , French ; Portuguese , Galician , Catalan , Sardinian , Romanian , Spanish  (now a loanword in English).

 Cunnus: the vulva 
 was the basic Latin word for the vulva.

 Etymology 
 has a distinguished Indo-European lineage. It is cognate with Persian  "anus" and  "vulva", and with Greek  (kusthos). Tucker and de Vaan derive it from an Indo-European *kut-nos akin to Welsh  'bag, scrotum'. Despite its similarity to "cunt", the Oxford English Dictionary cautions that the two words may have developed from different roots.

 Usage 
Cicero's  §154 confirms its obscene status. Cicero writes:
 
 ("We say  ("with them"), but we don't say  ['with us'], but rather ; because if we said it like that, the letters would run together in a rather obscene way.") 

Horace, however, uses the word  in his Satires at 1.2.70, and again at 1.3.105:

 
 ("For even before Helen, the cunt was a most loathsome cause of war")

Martial also uses it freely, for example (3.87):

 
("Rumour has it, Chione, that you have never been fucked   and that there is nothing purer than your cunt.However, you go to the baths without covering the part you should;   if you have any modesty, transfer your loincloth to your face!")

The following obscene poetic graffito from Pompeii is written in the trochaic septenarius metre:

("A hairy cunt is fucked much better than a smooth one:at the same time it retains the heat and at the same time it brushes the cock")

The word  occurs in literary Latin, most frequently in Martial; it denotes the person who performs the action, not the action itself as in modern English, where it is not obscene but technical. The term comes from the Latin word for the vulva and the verb "to lick" (cf.  "tongue").

 Synonyms and metaphors 

The modern scientific or polite words vulva and vagina both stem from Latin, but originally they had different meanings. The word  is the Latin word for scabbard or sword-sheath.

 (or ) in classical Latin generally signified the womb, especially in medical writing, and also it is also common in the Vetus Latina (pre-Jerome) version of the Bible. At Juvenal 6.129, however, the word  is used of the vagina or clitoris of the (allegedly) nymphomaniac empress Messalina, who is described as departing from a session in a brothel:

("still burning with the excitement of her rigid 'volva',tired out by men but still not satisfied, she departs")

 In the Romance languages 
 is preserved in almost every Romance language: e.g. French , Catalan , Spanish , Galician , Portuguese , (South) Sardinian , Old Italian . In Portuguese it has been transferred to the feminine gender; the form  is also attested in Pompeian graffiti and in some late Latin texts.

 : the clitoris 
This appears to have been one of the most obscene words in the entire Latin lexicon. It is alluded to, but does not appear, in literary sources, except in the Priapeia 79, which calls it , the "poor little clitoris". It does, however, appear in graffiti.

 Usage 
Not even the poets Catullus and Martial, whose frankness is notorious, ever refer to landīca. In a letter to a friend, Cicero discusses which words in Latin are potentially obscene or subject to obscene punning, and there hints at the word  by quoting an unintentionally obscene utterance made in the Senate:

 
 "shall I say that this or that was the greater fault?" 

with  echoing the forbidden word.

The word  is found in Roman graffiti:  ("I seek Fulvia's clitoris") appears on a leaden projectile found at Perugia left over from the Perusine War, while a derivative word is found in Pompeii:  ("Euplia (is) loose and has a large clitoris").

 
 ("But may the gods and goddesses deny your teeth any food, you who licked the cunt of my neighbouring girlfriend, because of whom this brave girl who has never told a lie, and who used to come running quickly to me, now, poor thing, swears she can hardly walk because of the grooves in her clitoris.")

The word also occurs twice in a medical context in a 5th-6th century Latin translation of Soranus of Ephesus's book on gynaecology.

 Synonyms and metaphors 
Martial's epigram 1.90 alludes to a woman who uses her clitoris as a penis in a lesbian encounter, referring to it as her "prodigious Venus":

 
 ("You dare to rub two cunts together  and your prodigious Venus pretends to be a man.")

In the Satires of Juvenal it is referred to euphemistically as a crista, "crest" in this line (6.420), describing a lady's massage after an exercise session:

 
 ("And the cunning masseur presses his fingers on her 'crest'and causes the top of his mistress's thigh to cry aloud")

 In the Romance languages 
 survived in Old French landie (extremely rare), and in Romanian lindic.

 : the anus 
Though not very common, it occurs in both Catullus and Martial, and is productive in Romance. The word is of uncertain etymology, according to Adams.

Usage
In the texts  appears to be used mainly of humans. It was associated with both defecation and with sex. Catullus (23) mocks a certain Furius with these words:

("Because your arsehole is purer than a salt-cellarand you don't shit even ten times in a whole year,and the shit is harder than beans and pebbles;which, if you were to rub it and crumble it with your hands,you could never dirty your finger")

Martial (2.51) mocks a passive homosexual in these terms:

 
("Though you often have only one denarius in your whole money-chest,   Hyllus, and that rubbed smoother than your arsehole,yet it's not the baker, nor the innkeeper, who will take that away from you,   but anyone who is proud of his over-sized penis.Your unlucky stomach looks at the banquets of your arsehole,   and the former is always hungry, poor thing, while the latter devours.")

In a verse fable of Phaedrus, the word is used of dogs:

("Whenever (a dog) sees a new one coming, he smells its anus.")

  
This word is thought to be an o-stem version of the same root as  "to fart", identifying it as the source of flatulence. Lewis and Short's Dictionary cites only two instances. In an unattractive picture of an old woman Horace (Epodes 8.6) writes:

("And (when) there gapes between your wrinkled buttocksan ugly arsehole like that of a cow with diarrhoea.")

Juvenal (2.12), writing of outwardly virile but in practice effeminate philosophers, writes:

("Your hairy limbs and the tough bristles along your armspromise a stern spirit, it's true, but from your smooth arseholeswollen figs (i.e. piles) are cut out as the doctor laughs.")

The implication is that the piles have been caused by anal sex; that such anal piles or sores are caused by sex is a common theme in the poems of Martial.

Martial uses both  and  synonymously in the following poem (6.37):

("Of his arsehole cut open right up to his navelCharimus has no trace left;and yet he itches right up to his navel.O, under what great urges the poor man labours!He has no anus, and yet he's still a fag!")

It is not used by Catullus, and only twice by Martial. It is not found in Pompeii, and did not produce derivatives in vulgar Latin or in the Romance languages.

 (not to be confused with  "an old woman") corresponds to the English derivative "anus". The word is metaphorical and originally meant "ring". Its anatomical sense drove out its other meanings, and for this reason the diminutive  became the usual Latin name for a ring or circle. 

The word is common in medical writings. In his book on agriculture, Columella describes how to treat a cow with stomach-ache:

("If any pain remains, trim your nails, insert your oiled hand through its anus and extract the dung.")

It does not seem to have been regarded as an obscenity, and in his letter on different Latin obscene words, Cicero says: 

("You call an 'anus' by a name not its own; why not use its own name? If it is something obscene, it should not be referred to even by another name; if it is not, it should be called by its own name.")

In the Latin Bible, the word is used for "haemorrhoids":

("You shall make five golden haemorrhoids.")

("Fearing lest something similar might happen again,they fill the dogs' anus with perfume, and a lot of it.")

An example of the usage of "ring" as a metaphor in a modern Romance language can be found in Brazilian Portuguese slang, in which the word anel can have the same double meaning, especially in the expression o anel de couro (the leather ring). "Ring" is also British slang for "anus".

Buttocks
It can be used for the rump of animals as well as humans, and even birds. The word is usually plural but sometimes singular. In the same satire quoted above Juvenal (2.20–21) speaks scathingly of philosophers who have double standards, preaching about virtue but practising vice:

("They speak of virtuebut waggle their rump. 'Am I going to respect you, Sextus, when you behave in such a camp way?'")

Another word for buttocks, slightly less common, was natēs, which is generally used only of the buttocks of humans. It seems to have been a more vulgar or colloquial word than clūnēs. In one of the Priapeia epigrams (22, in some editions 21) the god Priapus threatens potential thieves with punishment as follows:

("If any woman steals (from my garden) or a man or a boy,the first must provide her cunt, the second his head, the third his buttocks.")

 In the Romance languages 
 has been preserved as meaning the buttocks (rather than the anus) in most Romance languages except for Portuguese, which kept the original semantics. It yields the forms culo in Spanish and Italian; in French and Catalan it becomes cul, in Romanian cur, in Vegliot Dalmatian čol, in Sardinian and Sicilian culu, in Portuguese cu and in Galician cu. Its offensiveness varies from one language to another; in French it was incorporated into ordinary words and expressions such as culottes, "breeches", and cul-de-sac.

 : to fuck 

, infinitive , perfect , supine , Latin for "to fuck", is richly attested and useful. 

 is richly attested in all its forms in Latin literature. In one poem (10.81.1) Martial writes, using the supine:

("When two men came one morning to Phyllis for a fuck...")

The god Priapus says in one poem (Priapeia 63):

("To this (p....) of mine, a girl – I almost added the name –is accustomed to come with her boyfriend") 

, unlike the English word "fuck", was more frequently used in erotic and celebratory senses rather than derogatory ones or insults. A woman of Pompeii wrote the graffito  ("I got laid here") and prostitutes, canny at marketing, appear to have written other graffiti complimenting their customers for their sexual prowess: 

 
("Lucky boy, you fuck well"); 

 
("Victorious, best wishes to one who fucks well"). 

It is famously used in Catullus 32:

 
 ("but you remain at home and prepare for usnine acts of fucking, one after the other.")

 in its active voice was used of women only when it was imagined that they were taking the active role thought appropriate to the male partner by the Romans.

 
 ("Lesbian of all lesbians, Philaenis,you are right to call the woman you fuck, your 'girlfriend'.")

 ("What has changed you? Is it because I'm sleeping with the queen? ... So is Drusilla the only woman you sleep with?")

It can be used for both men and women, and also of animals and birds.

A Pompeian inscription says  ("Dionysius is allowed to fuck whenever he wants to"). The Latin word  appears to be used in the same sense in Priapeia 31:  ("these weapons of my belly will relax you" (of ).

Adams (1982) lists a large number of other euphemisms for the sexual act, such as this one from Juvenal (6.126):

("And lying on her back she absorbed the blows of all and sundry")

 In the Romance languages 
, a core item of the lexicon, lives on in most of the Romance languages, sometimes with its sense somewhat weakened: Catalan fotre, French foutre, Spanish joder, Portuguese foder, Galician foder, Romanian fute (futere), Italian fottere.  A famous ribald song in Old Occitan sometimes attributed to the troubadour William IX of Aquitaine reads:
 Tant las fotei com auziretz:Cen e quatre vint et ueit vetz,<br/ >Q'a pauc no-i rompei mos corretzE mos arnes ("I fucked them as much as you will hear:a hundred and eighty-eight times.I most nearly broke my equipment-- and my tool.")

 : to sodomise 
The aggressive sense of English "fuck" and "screw" was not strongly attached to futuō in Latin. Instead, these aggressive connotations attached themselves to pēdīcāre "to sodomise" and  "to force fellatio" respectively, which were used with mock hostility in Catullus 16:

 
 ("I will bugger and facefuck you,pervert Aurelius and faggot Furius,since you thought me indecentbecause my poems are somewhat sissified.")

The passive voice, is used of the person who is forced to submit to anal sex, as in Priapeia 35, in which the god Priapus threatens a thief:

("You will be buggered, thief, on the first offence; but ifyou are caught a second time, I will stick it in your mouth.")

There is some doubt in the dictionaries whether the correct spelling was ped- or paed- (Lewis and Short give the latter). Bücheler (1915, p. 105) argues that ped- is correct on the basis of the following epigram in the Priapeia (no. 67):

("Let the first syllable of 'Penelope' be followed by the first of 'Dido',   and the first of 'Cadmus' by the first of 'Remus',and what comes out of them is what you will pay to me if you are caught in the garden,   thief; it is with this penalty you must pay for your crime.")

 ("Once you were rich; but in those days you were a pēdīco,   and for a long time no woman was known to you.Now you chase after old women. O the things that poverty forces one to do!   That woman is making a fucker out of you, Charidemus!")

 ("You say that buggerers' mouths stink.If this is true as you say, Fabullus,what do you think the mouth of pussy-lickers smells of?")

The various distinctions in sexual activity are made clear in the following poem of Martial (2.28):

 
 ("Laugh a lot, Sextillus, if anyone calls you effeminate (cinaedus),   and show him your middle finger;but you're also neither a buggerer (pēdīco) nor a fucker (futūtor),   nor does the hot mouth of Vetustina please you.You're none of those, I admit, Sextillus, so what are you?   I don't know, but you know there are only two other possibilities!")

Etymology
 is often thought to be a Greek loanword in Latin (from the noun  (paidika) "boyfriend"), but the long "i" is an obstacle.

In Romance
Unlike , the word  has no reflexes in Romance. The French slang word pédé ("male homosexual") is an abbreviated form of pédéraste, according to the Dictionnaire historique de la langue française.

 and : oral sex

: to make suck

To be forced to submit to oral sex was apparently a worse punishment than to be sodomised. Martial (2.47) advises one effeminate man who is having an adulterous affair, and who would not perhaps have objected too much if the husband punished him by sodomising him:

("Do you rely on your buttocks (to avoid a worse punishment)? Your girlfriend's husband is not a sodomiser.   He does two things only: puts it in your mouth or screws women.")

Martial (3.96) writes:

("You gossip like an adulterer and a womaniser;but if I catch you, Gargilius, you will be quiet!")

 was seen as a hostile act that enemies might inflict on one. An inscription says:

("I would prefer my friends to suck me than that my enemies make me suck them.")

It is also a standard threat made by the god Priapus, protector of orchards, to potential adult male thieves, as in Priapeia 13:

("You will be thoroughly 'cut', boy, I warn you; girl, you will be fucked;   for the bearded thief, a third penalty awaits.")

: to suck
The word  originally had an innocent sense, meaning to suck the teat or to suck milk, but in classical times the sexual sense was predominant. The verb fellō and the nouns  and (less often) the feminine  are common in graffiti, and the first two also occur several times in Martial's epigrams. The practice was thought particularly degrading for a man, and Martial, mocking a certain masculine lesbian, writes (7.67):

("She does not suck cocks – she thinks this not masculine enough –but absolutely devours the middle parts of girls.")

 was generally used absolutely, without an object. A Pompeian wall inscription says  ("Myrtis, you suck well"), and another says  ("Romula does fellatio with her boyfriend here and everywhere").

Though it is not represented by descendants, it is represented by learned borrowings such as the French fellation.

 and : to lick
The verb  ("I lick") was common in both sexual and non-sexual contexts. Martial (3.96) writes:

("You lick my girlfriend, you don't fuck her;and you boast about it as if you were an adulterer and a fucker.But if I catch you, Gargilius, you'll shut up!")

Its synonym  was also sometimes used in a sexual sense. Martial (3.81) criticises a eunuch who presumed to have oral sex with women: 

("That tongue of yours ought to be licking the middle parts of men (not women)")

: to "peel"
 "to take the bark off", "peel" and  "to take the husk off", "to skin, flay" are famously used in a sexual sense in two places in Latin literature by Catullus and Ausonius. It has been argued that the meaning is to pull back a man's foreskin, in order to masturbate him. Ausonius (Ep. 71), after mentioning various perversions, says:

("Crispa, however, practices all the perversions in one body:she 'peels', she sucks, she puts it in either hole,lest she leave anything untried before she dies.")

What seems to shock Ausonius is that Crispa actively enjoyed taking an active role in such practices rather than passively submitting to male desires as was the norm.

The other sexual use of this word is in Catullus (57), who says in a moment of bitterness:

("Caelius, our Lesbia, that Lesbia,that one woman whom Catullusloved more than himself and all his dear onesnow on crossroads and in alleys'peels' the grandsons of magnanimous Remus.")

  and : to waggle 

 Etymology 
Both of these verbs are of fairly obscure origin.

Unlike some of the vocabulary of homosexuality in Latin,  seems not to be of Greek origin. Francis A. Wood relates it to an Indo-European root *kweu- or *qeu-, relating to a variety of back and forth motions.

 Usage 
 always refers to a male taking the bottom role in anal sex. Martial 3.95 contains the phrase:

  
("But you get buggered and you wiggle your arse so prettily, Naevolus.") 

 appears to have had a similar meaning, but to have been used of the female. Martial writes of a Spanish dancing-girl (who he suggests would make a suitable present for someone):

 
 ("She waggles so tremulously, she arouses so charmingly, that she has made Hippolytus himself into a masturbator")

Again Martial 10.68:

 
 ("Could you possibly be prettier as you grind? You learn easily, and could do everything they do in Corinth; but you'll never quite be Lais, Laelia.")

Lais was a famous prostitute or courtesan, and Corinth was the site of a major temple of Aphrodite; the temple employed more than a thousand cult prostitutes.

 Synonyms and metaphors 
These words have few synonyms or metaphors, and belong almost to a sort of technical vocabulary.

 In the Romance languages 
Both words seem to have been lost in Romance.

: to masturbate
This word is found twice in the poet Martial, but apparently not in earlier writers. Martial writes in one poem (11.104):

("The Phrygian slaves used to masturbate behind the doors   whenever Hector's wife sat on her husband's 'horse'.")

The word  also occurs. In 14.203 Martial writes of a Spanish girl from Gādēs (Cádiz):

("She wiggles so sexily and itches for it so charmingly   that she would have made a masturbator out of Hippolytus himself!")

Hippolytus was famous in mythology for his chastity, and for refusing the advances of his stepmother, Phaedra.

Etymology
Lewis and Short suggest that the word  may be derived from  "to defile oneself with a hand", and this is the usual view, and supported ("with some hesitation") by J.N. Adams. The supporters of this view cite another word  (from ), which occurs once in Latin literature in Petronius (134.5), and which appears from the context to mean "beating the penis with a wand (to stimulate it)". Yet another proposed etymology is that the element masturb- derives from a Proto-Indo-European root *mostrgh- meaning "brain, marrow", and hence "semen".

Synonyms and euphemisms
Martial (9.41) criticises a Roman gentleman for masturbating, using the phrase: 

("you use your left hand as a concubine and your hand serves Venus as your girlfriend")

The hand used for masturbating by the Romans was evidently the left one, as Martial 11.73 confirms.

In another poem (11.22) Martial advises a friend:

 
("do at least cease from troubling your groins with copulating hand"). 

He continues:

("In smooth-skinned boys this (i.e their hand) sins more than their cock,   and their fingers hasten the process of turning them into a man.")

This apparently dates back to a belief of Aristotle that vigorous sexual activity caused a boy's voice to turn rapidly into that of a man.

In another poem (2.43), however, Martial admits that he himself for want of a sexual partner sometimes resorts to the practice: 

("but as for me, my hand has to serve instead of Ganymede").

In another (11.46), addressed to a man who finds it difficult in middle age to get an erection, Martial uses the word  ("I shove" or "prod") to signify masturbation: 

 
("and your shrivelled dick is prodded by your fingers until they get tired,   but doesn't raise its worn out head even when provoked").

This occurs in only one place, in Catullus 56:

 
 ("Recently I caught the ward of my girlfriend'thrusting'; this boy, if it please Dione,using my 'hard one' as a weapon, I 'cut'.")

The meaning of  here is disputed. Uden (2007) translates: "I just caught a kid banging his girlfriend", explaining that  is a derogatory diminutive.

The verb  (literally "to cut" or "kill") is used as slang for homosexual penetration elsewhere in Latin literature, such as at Priapeia 26.10, a poem in which Priapus boasts that in his earlier days  ("I used to 'cut' (i.e. sodomise) thieves, however strong they were"). Dione, was the mother of Aphrodite (Venus), goddess of love; but the term was also used in poetry for Venus herself.

 : to defecate 
 was the chief Latin word for defecation.

 Etymology 
The word has a distinguished Indo-European parentage, which may perhaps relate to nursery words or children's slang that tends to recur across many different cultures. It would appear to be cognate with the Greek noun , kopros, meaning "excrement" (hence, coprophilia). It also exists in Germanic; in German, Swedish (kack), Scots (as both noun and verb, cack or cackie, the diminutive), whilst English "poppiecock" derives from Dutch pappe kak, "diarrhea".  It exists in Turkish (kaka), Irish and Scottish Gaelic (cac), Hebrew, Arabic dialects, Hungarian (kaka), Ukrainian (какати), Russian, Lithuanian and Persian/Isfahani accent (keke). In British English, "caca" is occasionally used as childish slang for excrement (similar to American English "poop"), a word whose level of obscene loading varies from country to country; whilst in Scotland and in Ireland, "cack" is occasionally used either as a mild interjection, or as an impolite adjective to mean of poor quality, broken, nonsense. It also exists as a loan in Finnish (kakka). The derivatives of this Latin word appear in Spanish, Catalan, Portuguese, Italian (cacca), Romanian, and French.
Also, in Slavic languages: kakati.

 Usage 
The verb is usually used intransitively. Martial (1.92.11) says:

("not your arsehole, for something that never shits isn't an arsehole")

However, in the phrase below, from Catullus 36, it is transitive:
 
 ("Volusius's Annals, paper covered in shit")

The prefixed form  is transitive. Seneca describes the Emperor Claudius's final words, spoken after farting loudly:

 
 ("His last saying heard among mortals was the following, after he had let out a rather loud sound from that part with which he spoke more easily: 'O no, I think I've shat myself!' Whether he did or not, I don't know. He certainly shat on everything else.")

 Synonyms and metaphors 
Few synonyms are attested in Classical Latin, apart from a word , attested by the grammarian Festus (but nowhere else) in the meaning . The word  comes much later. 

A euphemism which occurs in Petronius (116) is :

("We also had whole-wheat bread, which I prefer to white, since it gives you strength and also when I relieve myself, I don't feel pain.")

The same euphemism is used in Petronius of relieving oneself of gas (see below).

 In the Romance languages 
 is preserved unaltered in Sardinian and the southern Italian dialects, and with little alteration in Italian (cagare). It becomes Galician, Catalan, Spanish, and Portuguese cagar, in Vegliot Dalmatian kakuor, in French chier, and in Romanian as căcare (the act of taking a dump) or a (se) căca. (Feces are referred to as caca in French, Catalan, Romanian (besides căcat) and Spanish childhood slang, while Portuguese and Romanian use the very same word with the general meaning of anything that looks or smells malodorous or reminiscent of excrement.) German kacken, Dutch kakken, Czech kakat, Lithuanian kakoti, Russian какать (kakat), Icelandic kúka, Bosnian kakiti etc. are all slang words meaning "to defecate", most of them having roughly the same level of severity as the English expression "take a dump".

 : feces 
 is the basic Latin word for excrement. Frequently used, it appears in most of the Romance languages.

 Etymology 
 represents Indo-European *s-merd-, whose root sense was likely "something malodorous." It is cognate with German Mist (dung), Lithuanian "smirdė́ti" ("to stink"), Russian "смерде́ть" (smerdét, "to stink") and Polish śmierdzieć ("to stink").

 Usage 
The word  is attested in classical texts mostly in veterinary and agricultural contexts, meaning "manure".

Unlike the English word "shit",  could be both singular and plural. In Horace (Satires 1.8.37), a talking statue of Priapus says:

("But if I'm telling a lie, may my head be spattered with the white droppingsof ravens, and may Julius, delicate Pediatia, and the thief Voranuscome to piss and shit on me!")

In one of his verse fables (4.18.25), Phaedrus speaks of some dogs who have had their backsides deodorised with perfume. But on hearing thunder,

("suddenly they shit out the perfume mixed with turds")

The word can also be used in a metaphorical sense, as at Martial 3.17, speaking of a pastry which had been blown on by a man with impure breath (caused no doubt by oral sex) to cool it down:

 
 ("But nobody could touch it: it was a piece of shit'''.")

 Synonyms and metaphors 

 
 ("Raising up the needy from the earth : and lifting up the poor out of the dunghill." DRC)

In Classical Latin, plural , meant the dregs, such as are found in a bottle of wine; the word did not acquire the sense of feces until later.

 In the Romance languages 
 is productive in the Romance languages, and is the etymon of French merde, Spanish mierda, and in Vegliot Dalmatian miarda. It is preserved unaltered in Catalan, Galician, Italian, Portuguese, and Sardinian. It was preserved in Romanian too, not for feces, where căcat (derived from caco) is used instead, but in the word dezmierda, originally meaning "to clean the bottom of (an infant)"; subsequently becoming "to cuddle" or "to fondle".

  and : passing wind 

 is the basic Latin word for passing intestinal wind. In the Sermones 1.8, 46, Horace writes:

 

Christopher Smart translates this passage as "from my cleft bum of fig-tree I let out a fart, which made as great an explosion as a burst bladder". The "I" of this satire is the god Priapus, and Smart explains that he was made of fig-tree wood which split through being poorly prepared.

Martial also uses the word several times, including the following (10.15):

 
 ("I don't see any other reason why I should believe you a friend,    other than that you are in the habit of farting in front of me, Crispus.")

A word  ("to fart in the face of, mock") is used in Horace (Sat. 1.9.70).

Catullus also uses the noun  in one of his poems (54).

  
This is hinted at in Cicero's letter ad Fam. 9.22, where he says that the word  is potentially obscene, in the same way as the word . The word is not recorded in Lewis and Short's Latin Dictionary and does not appear to have been used by any extant author. However, the Oxford Latin Dictionary quotes an inscription from a public bath in Ostia which says 

 
("cunning Chilon taught how to fart silently").

Judging from derivatives in some of the daughter languages (see below), there was also a noun * "a silent fart", but no trace of this is found in the extant texts.

The noise made by escaping flatulence was usually called , a word which could refer to "a noise" of various kinds, and the verb  was used of breaking wind noisily. Martial writes of a certain man, who after an embarrassing incident of flatulence when praying in the temple of Jupiter, was careful in the future to take precautions:

("Whenever he wants to come to the Capitolium (to pray)he first heads for the toilets of Paterclusand farts ten or twenty times.But however much he takes precautions by breaking wind,he still salutes Jupiter with clenched buttocks.")

Euphemisms
In Petronius (47), in the speech of the vulgar millionaire Trimalchio, euphemisms  and  "do what helps one" are both used for relieving oneself of wind:

("And so if any of you wants to relieve himself (of wind), there's no need for him to be ashamed. Personally I think there's nothing worse than holding it in. And I never forbid anyone to relieve himself of wind even in the dining-room, and doctors forbid people to hold it in as well.")

 Etymology 
It is cognate with Greek  (perdomai), English fart, Bulgarian prdi, Polish pierdzieć, Russian пердеть (perdet), Lithuanian persti, Sanskrit pardate, and Avestan pərəδaiti, all of which mean the same thing.

 is clearly onomatopoeic. The Old Norse fisa may be compared, although the correspondence in sounds is not exact.

In the Romance languages and English 
 and  survive in Romance.  In French, the noun pet from pēditum and the derived verb péter (for earlier poire from pēdere) are very much alive. In Catalan, the verb is petar-se and the noun is pet. In Spanish the noun pedo as well as the verbs peerse and pedorrear are similarly derived. Portuguese peido and peidar(-se), (-dei) and Galician peido and peidar(se) are related.  Italian peto is less common than scorreggia and its derived verb scorreggiare, but in Neapolitan pireto is frequently used.

The English word petard, found mostly in the cliché "hoist with his own petard", comes from an early explosive device, the noise of which was likened to that of farting. English also has petomania for a musical performance of breaking intestinal wind, and petomane for the performer, after Le Pétomane, a French performer active in the early 20th century.

, though rare in Latin texts, has derivates in several Romance languages, such as Romanian bășí (verb) and bășínă (noun); French vesse (noun) and vesser (verb).

and : urination 

In some Late Latin texts a variant first conjugation form  is attested. This is the form that is productive in Romance.

The Classical Latin word  became the accepted medical word meaning "to urinate". It is the source of the English medical term "micturition reflex".

Usage 

 
 ("You pissed once off the side of a boat, Paulinus.   Do you want to piss again? then you will be Palinurus.")

(Note that palin is a Greek word meaning "once again". Palinurus was Aeneas's helmsman who fell overboard in a storm in the Aeneid.)

The verbs  and  could also be used euphemistically of sexual intercourse. Horace (Satires 1.2.44), speaking of the punishments meted out to adulterers, says:

("One got thoroughly 'pissed on' (i.e. raped) by the servants; it evenhappened once that they cut off someone's balls and lecherous 'tail'with a knife.")

Catullus (67.23) speaks of a father who "pissed in the lap of his own son", that is, had sex with his son's wife.

Urine 
The relationship with the Greek verb  (oureō), "to urinate", is not clear.

Catullus (37) writes contemptuously of a certain Spaniard who was one of the lovers of his girlfriend Lesbia:

 
("You above all, one of the long-haired ones,son of rabbit-filled Celtiberia,Egnatius, made handsome by your dark beard,and your teeth brushed clean with Iberian piss.")

The Romans, innocent of soap, collected urine as a source of ammonia to use in laundering clothes. The early agricultural writer Cato, an advocate of cabbage, used this word when he wrote ( 156):

("Cabbage is good for the digestion and for the urine.")

Etymology 
Meiere is an inherited Indo-European word. It relates to Sanskrit mehati, "urinates", Persian mīz, "urine", Lithuanian myža, "he/she urinates", Greek  (omeikhein), "to urinate", which, taken together, point to an Indo-European *h3meiģh-. This IE root with a palatal ģh was formerly mixed up (e. g. in Pokorny's IEW) with another one with velar *gh meaning "mist" (Russian mgla), hence erroneous tentative overall translations like "to sprinkle" or "to wet" which still turn up sometimes.

In the Romance languages 
Though mingere and meiere are the Classical Latin forms, meiāre seems to have been the popular form in Late Latin. This underlies Galician mexar, Portuguese mijar, and Spanish mear. *Pissiāre represents a borrowing from the Germanic languages, and appears elsewhere in the Romance territory, as in French pisser, Catalan pixar, Italian pisciare and Romanian a (se) pișa, along with English to piss.

Latin words relating to prostitution 

Compared to the anatomical frankness of the Roman vocabulary about sexual acts and body parts, the Roman vocabulary relating to prostitution seems euphemistic and metaphorical.

Prostitutes were called meretrīx, "earner", and lupa, "she-wolf"; a brothel was a lupānar; these words referred to the mercantile and perceived predatory activities of prostitutes. The Latin verb prōstō meant "to be up for sale"  and prōstituō meant "to expose for public sale."

The poet Juvenal (6.120-3) describes how the disgraced Empress Messalina used to enjoy playing the part of a prostitute in a brothel:

sed nigrum flāvō crīnem abscondente galērōintrāvit calidum veterī centōne lupānaret cellam vacuam atque suam; tunc nūda papillīsprōstitit aurātīs titulum mentīta Lyciscae
("But hiding her black hair with a yellow wig,wearing an old patchwork cloak, she entered the hot brotheland an empty cell of her own; then she offered herself for sale nudewith her nipples covered in gold, using the false name of 'Lycisca'.")

The pimp or pander in charge of the brothel, who dismissed the girls at closing time, was called lēnō if male (Juvenal 6.127) and lēna if female.

The neuter word scortum could refer to either a male or female prostitute. This word may relate to Latin scorteus, "made of leather or hide", much as English refers to the skin trade. Lewis and Short quote Varro: pellem antīquī dīcēbant scortum ("in the old days people referred to skin as scortum").

Another word for a male prostitute, notably one who is no longer a boy, is exolētus (literally "grown up, adult"). Cicero (pro Milone, 21, 55) writes:

Clōdius, quī semper sēcum scorta, semper exolētōs, semper lupās dūceret
("Clodius, who always used to take with him whores, and male and female prostitutes")

The verb scortor, scortārī, which occurs chiefly in Plautus, means "to go whoring" or "to employ prostitutes". Plautus illustrates its use in Asinaria:

 quandō mēcum pariter pōtant, pariter scortārī solent,hanc quidem, quam nactus, praedam pariter cum illīs partiam.
 ("Whenever they go drinking with me, they also usually go whoring with me.So I'll share this booty which I've captured with them equally.")

The important and productive words for a prostitute in Romance, *pūta or *pūtāna, are not attested in Classical Latin, despite their many Romance derivatives: French putain and pute, Italian puttana, Spanish, Filipino, Catalan, Portuguese and Galician puta. French linguists state that they relate to Latin pūteō, pūtēre, "to stink," and thus represent yet another metaphor.. Spaniards María Moliner (author of a famous dictionary of Spanish) and Joan Coromines think they came from Vulgar Latin *putta, feminine form of *puttus, an emphatic form of pūtus, "pure" or "boy". In Portugal, the word puto has the same connotation as "small kid" or "little boy"; in Brazil, on the other hand, it is slang for "pissed off" or enraged males in general or as a colloquial, mildly offensive term for male escorts (more formally called prostitutos or michês) – the male counterpart of the slang puta, with the same meanings.

In popular culture 

The HBO/BBC2 original television series Rome depicts the city with the grit and grime that is often absent from earlier productions, including that of language. But since the actors speak English, Latin profanity is mostly seen in written graffiti, such as:
 ATIA FELLAT, "Atia sucks"; "fellatio" is a noun derived from this verb.
 ATIA AMAT OMNES, "Atia loves all [men]". Thus calling her a whore or slut.
 CAESARI SERVILIA FUTATRIX, "Servilia is Caesar's bitch".

See also 

 Vulgar Latin
 Sexuality in ancient Rome
 Homosexuality in ancient Rome

Bibliography 
Primary literary sources are discussed in the text. Many of the graffiti discussed are found in the Corpus Inscriptionum Latinarum.
 Adams, Douglas Q. (1985) "Latin Mas and Masturbari". Glotta, 63. Bd., 3./4. H. (1985), pp. 241–247.
 Adams, James N. (1981a). "A Type of Sexual Euphemism in Latin". Phoenix, Vol. 35, No. 2 (Summer, 1981), pp. 120–128. Published by: Classical Association of Canada.
 Adams, James N. (1981b). "Culus, Clunes and Their Synonyms in Latin". Glotta, 59. Bd., 3./4. H. (1981), pp. 231–264.
 Adams, James N. (1983). "Martial 2. 83". Classical Philology, Vol. 78, No. 4 (Oct., 1983), pp. 311–315. (A reply to Richlin (1981).)
 Adams, James N. (1990 [1982]). The Latin Sexual Vocabulary (Johns Hopkins, 1990 [1982]) . (Introduction.)
 (Anon.) (1868). The Index Expurgatorius of Martial, Literally Translated, Comprising All the Epigrams hitherto Omitted by English Translators. Believed to have been written by George Augustus Sala and Edward Sellon among others. 
 Bain, David (1991). "Six Greek Verbs of Sexual Congress (βινω̑, κινω̑, πυγίζω, ληκω̑, οἴϕω, λαικάζω)"The Classical Quarterly, Vol. 41, No. 1 (1991), pp. 51–77. 
 Beckelhymer, Samuel David (2014). "The Way That Our Catullus Walked: Grammar and Poetry in the Late Republic". Publicly Accessible Penn Dissertations. 1205.
 Bücheler, Franz (1915). "Pedicare". Kleine Schriften, vol. 1, pp. 104–6. (in German)
 Currie, Bruno (1996). "A Note on Catullus 63.5". Classical Quarterly, Vol. 46, No. 2 (1996), pp. 579–581.
 Dutsch, Dorota and Ann Suter (ed.) (2015), Ancient Obscenities: Their Nature and Use in the Ancient Greek and Roman Worlds.   Ann Arbor:  University of Michigan Press. . Reviewed by Jeffrey Henderson Bryn Mawr Classical Review 2017.05.46.
 Fay, Edwin W. (1907) "Greek and Latin Word Studies". The Classical Quarterly, Vol. 1, No. 1 (Apr., 1907), pp. 13–30.
 Fisher, John (1976). The lexical affiliations of Vegliote (Fairleigh Dickinson University Press, 1976) 
 Fontaine, Michael (2009). Funny Words in Plautine Comedy (Oxford University Press). 
 Gellérfi, Gergő (2017). "Obscenity or Taboo? Remarks on Profanities in Juvenal and Martial". Graeco-Latina Brunensia 22 / 2017 / 2.
 Housman, A.E. (1930). "Draucus and Martial XI 8 1". The Classical Review, Vol. 44, No. 4 (Sep., 1930), pp. 114–116.
 Housman, A.E. (1931). Praefanda. Hermes, 66. Bd., H. 1 (Jan., 1931), pp. 402–412. (in Latin)
 Katz, Joshua, T. (1998). "Testimonia Ritus Italici: Male Genitalia, Solemn Declarations, and a New Latin Sound Law". Harvard Studies in Classical Philology, Vol. 98 (1998), pp. 183–217.
 Kokoszkiewicz, Konrad (2011). "Catullus 65.3: devolsit?. The Classical Quarterly, New Series, Vol. 61, No. 2 (December 2011), pp. 756–758.
 Messing, Gordon M. (1956) "The Etymology of Lat. Mentula". Classical Philology Vol. 51, No. 4 (Oct., 1956), pp. 247–249.
 Miller, P.A. (1998), "The Bodily Grotesque in Roman Satire: Images of Sterility". Arethusa 31.3 (1998) 257–283.
 Muse, Kevin (2009). "Fleecing Remus' Magnanimous Playboys: Wordplay in Catullus 58.5" Hermes, 137. Jahrg., H. 3 (2009), pp. 302–313.
 Penella, Robert J. (1976). A note on (De)glubere. Hermes, 104. Bd., H. 1 (1976), pp. 118–120.
 Richlin, Amy (1981). "The Meaning of Irrumare in Catullus and Martial". Classical Philology, Vol. 76, No. 1 (Jan., 1981), pp. 40–46.
 Sapsford, Francesca May (2012). The 'Epic' of Martial. University of Birmingham PhD thesis.
 Schultheiss, D., J.J. Mattelaer and F.M. Hodges (2003). "Preputial infibulation: from ancient medicine to modern genital piercing". BJU International 92(7):758-63, December 2003.
 Scott, William C. (1969). "Catullus and Cato (c. 56)". Classical Philology, Vol. 64, No. 1 (Jan., 1969), pp. 24–29. The University of Chicago Press. 
 Smart, Christopher. Quinti Horatii Flacci Opera, with a literal translation into English Prose (London, Sampson Low, 1882)
 Sullivan, J. P. (1990). "Martial and English Poetry". Classical Antiquity Vol. 9, No. 1 (Apr., 1990), pp. 149-17.
 Taylor, Rabun (1997). "Two Pathic Subcultures in Ancient Rome". Journal of the History of Sexuality, Vol. 7, No. 3 (Jan., 1997), pp. 319–371.
 Tucker, T. G., Etymological Dictionary of Latin (Halle, 1931, repr. Ares Publishers, 1985) 
 Uden, James (2007). "Impersonating Priapus". The American Journal of Philology, Vol. 128, No. 1 (Spring, 2007), pp. 1-26.
 Varone, Antonio (2002). Erotica Pompeiana: Love Inscriptions on the Walls of Pompeii, trans. Ria P. Berg. (Rome) (Selected pages on Google books.)
 Watson, Lindsay C. (2005). "Catullan Recycling? Cacata carta". Mnemosyne, Fourth Series, Vol. 58, Fasc. 2 (2005), pp. 270–277.
 Wehrle, W. T. (2008). "Gurgulio at Persius 4.38". Symbolae Osloenses: Norwegian Journal of Greek and Latin Studies. 68 - Issue 1.
 Williams, Craig A. (2010), Roman Homosexuality. Second Edition (first published 1999). Oxford/New York:  Oxford University Press, 2010.  .
 Wood, Francis A. (1905) "The IE. Root '*Qeu'-: Nuere, Nutare, Cevere; Quatere, Cudere; Cubare, Incumbere. II" In Modern Philology, vol. 17, p. 567 ff. (Univ. Chicago, 1905)
 Wray, David (2001). "Attis' Groin Weights (Catullus 63.5)". Classical Philology, Vol. 96, No. 2 (Apr., 2001), pp. 120–126.

Notes

External links 

 The Priapeia (Latin and English)
 Poems of Martial (Latin)
 Poems of Catullus (Latin)
 Poems of Horace (Latin)
 Corpus Inscriptionum Latinarum (German and English; partial)
 Latein-Online List of Swear Words (German)
 Cicero's letter ad Fam. 9.22. (Perseus database)

 Obs
Profanity by language